Dystaxia may refer to:

 A mild form of ataxia, a neurological sign consisting of lack of voluntary coordination of muscle movements
 Dystaxia (genus), a beetle genus

See also